Sema Nancy Ludrick Rivas is a  Nicaraguan  weightlifter. She represents  Nicaragua at the 2020 Summer Olympics in Tokyo.

References

External links
 

1999 births
Living people
Weightlifters at the 2020 Summer Olympics
Olympic weightlifters of Nicaragua
Nicaraguan female weightlifters
Pan American Games competitors for Nicaragua
Weightlifters at the 2019 Pan American Games
People from the North Caribbean Coast Autonomous Region
20th-century Nicaraguan women
21st-century Nicaraguan women